William Blunt (1800–1889) was a British civil servant.

William Blunt may also refer to:

Sir Charles William Blunt, 3rd Baronet (1731–1802), of the Blunt baronets
Sir Charles William Blunt, 6th Baronet (1810–1890), of the Blunt baronets
Sir William Blunt, 7th Baronet (1826–1902), of the Blunt baronets
Billy Blunt (1886–1962), English footballer

See also
William Blount (disambiguation)
Blunt (surname)